Xianghua is a town in Xichuan County, Nanyang City, Henan province, Central China. Xianghua is famous for hot peppers, there is a big hot pepper market in the town and it used to be the biggest hot pepper market in China.

Geography
Xianghua town is situated at the Southeastern part of Xichuan.the Danjiangkou Reservoir is located in the west of Xianghua town.

References

Xichuan County
Towns in Nanyang, Henan